Michael Phillip Anderson (December 25, 1959 – February 1, 2003) was a United States Air Force officer and NASA astronaut. Anderson and his six fellow crew members were killed in the Space Shuttle Columbia disaster when the craft disintegrated during its re-entry into the Earth's atmosphere. Anderson served as the payload commander and lieutenant colonel in charge of science experiments on the Columbia. Anderson was posthumously awarded the Congressional Space Medal of Honor.

Early life and education
Born in 1959 to Barbara and Bobbie Anderson, Michael Anderson was an only child; his father serviced jets at Plattsburgh Air Force Base in Plattsburgh, New York. Bobbie Anderson was transferred to Fairchild Air Force Base, about 12 miles away from Spokane, Washington, which Anderson spoke of as his hometown. He graduated from Cheney High School in Cheney, Washington, one of four African Americans in a class of 200 students.

In 1981, Anderson earned a Bachelor of Science degree in physics and astronomy from the University of Washington in Seattle, and in 1990 he was awarded a Master of Science degree in physics from Creighton University in Omaha.

Air Force career
Upon Anderson's graduation from the University of Washington, he was commissioned a second lieutenant in the U.S. Air Force. After completing a year of technical training at Keesler Air Force Base in Mississippi, he was assigned to Randolph Air Force Base in Texas. At Randolph he served as chief of communication maintenance for the 2015th Communication Squadron and later as director of information system maintenance for the 1920th Information System Group.

In 1986, he was selected to attend Undergraduate Pilot Training at Vance Air Force Base, Oklahoma. Upon graduation he was assigned to the 2d Airborne Command and Control Squadron, Offutt Air Force Base, Nebraska as an EC-135 pilot, flying the Strategic Air Command's airborne command post code-named "Looking Glass." He completed his master's degree while stationed at Offutt.

From January 1991 to September 1992, he served as an aircraft commander and instructor pilot in the 920th Air Refueling Squadron, Wurtsmith Air Force Base, Michigan.

From September 1992 to February 1995 he was assigned as an instructor pilot and tactics officer in the 380th Air Refueling Wing, Plattsburgh Air Force Base, New York.

Anderson had logged more than 3,000 hours of flight time when NASA selected him for astronaut training in December 1994. He was one of 19 candidates selected from a pool of 2,962 applicants.

Special honors 
Distinguished graduate, USAF Communication Electronics Officers course
The Armed Forces Communication Electronics Associations Academic Excellence Award
Undergraduate Pilot Training Academic Achievement Award for Class 87-08 Vance AFB

NASA

Anderson reported to the Johnson Space Center in March 1995. He completed a year of training and evaluation, and was qualified for flight crew assignment as a mission specialist. Anderson was initially assigned technical duties in the Flight Support Branch of the Astronaut Office, but went on to log more than 593 hours in space aboard two Space Shuttle missions.

Space Shuttle missions

Endeavour 

STS-89 Endeavour (January 22–31, 1998). Anderson was a mission specialist on STS-89, the eighth Shuttle-to-Mir Space Station docking mission, during which the crew delivered more than 9,000 pounds of scientific equipment, logistical hardware, and water.

In the fifth and last exchange of a U.S. astronaut, STS-89 delivered Andy Thomas to Mir and returned with David Wolf. The mission's duration was 8 days, 19 hours, and 47 seconds, traveling 3.6 million miles in 138 orbits of the Earth.

Columbia 

STS-107 Space Shuttle Columbia (January 16-February 1, 2003). Anderson served as payload commander and lieutenant colonel in charge of science experiments on the Columbia, NASA's oldest shuttle. On February 1, 2003, the shuttle was returning to Earth after a successful 16-day trip to orbit, where the crew had conducted more than 80 scientific experiments.

Unbeknownst to her crew, the orbiter had suffered critical damage during its launch on January 16, when foam from the fuel tank's insulation fell off and tore a hole in Columbia's left wing. During re-entry, the hole allowed super-hot atmospheric gases to penetrate the orbiter's wing, leading to its destruction. The mission's duration was 15 days, 22 hours, and 20 minutes.

The Columbia Accident Investigation Board reported that, in addition to the Columbias physical damage, NASA's management culture was partly responsible for the disaster.

Quotes
Prior to the final launch of the Columbia, Anderson told reporters: "There's always that unknown."

Personal life
Anderson was survived by his wife, Sandra Hawkins, and two daughters, Kaycee and Sydney. He was also survived by his parents and three sisters.

Anderson and his family lived in Houston at the time of his death, where they attended Grace Community Church. Anderson sang tenor in the church's choir.

Awards

Legacy and tributes

State Route 904, running through Cheney, Washington, where he graduated from high school, was renamed in his memory.
The science and math wing of Cheney High School is dedicated to his memory.
Asteroid 51824 Mikeanderson was posthumously named after Anderson.
 Anderson Hall, in the Columbia Village apartments at the Florida Institute of Technology is named after him.
 Anderson Plaza, the green space in front of the Hixson-Lied Science Center at Creighton University was named after him in a compromise between the student body, who wanted the Science Center named for Anderson, and the administration who had already sold the naming rights to the Hixson-Lied family.
 Blair Elementary School on Fairchild Air Force Base in Washington was renamed Michael Anderson Elementary School in January 2004. Anderson attended the school as a fifth-grader.
 Avondale Elementary School in Avondale, Arizona was renamed Michael Anderson Elementary in his honor.  He attended school there when he was in 3rd grade, and one of the school T-shirts was aboard the Columbia on its last voyage.
 In 2003 he was inducted into the International Forest of Friendship, in Atchison, KS as part of a memorial to the Columbia astronauts.
 Anderson Park in Canton, Mississippi was dedicated in June 2004.
 An outdoor bronze statue of Anderson was unveiled in Spokane in June 2005. Larger-than-life, it was created by local artist Dorothy Fowler, and shows Anderson kneeling with his helmet in one hand and a dove in the other.
 A duplicate statue was dedicated at the Museum of Flight in Seattle in June 2009 and the museum launched an aerospace program in his honor.
 An outdoor mural in the city of Plattsburgh was unveiled in October 2020 honoring Michael P. Anderson.  On July 4, 2021, the city of Plattsburgh held a dedication for the mural, where the Anderson family was given a key to the city and lead the annual Independence day parade.
 Lunar crater M. Anderson is named after him.
 The Creighton University Physics Department, from which he received his master's degree, maintains a statue and physics scholarship in his honor.

See also
List of African-American astronauts
Space Shuttle Columbia disaster
Space science

References

External links

 
 Michael Anderson STS-107 Crew Memorial
 Florida Today - Florida Tech dedicates dorms to Columbia 7 - October 29, 2003
 The Chicago Alliance for Minority Participation Keynote Address by Major Michael P. Anderson
Museum of Flight:  Michael P. Anderson Memorial Aerospace Program
HistoryLink.org: Michael P. Anderson

1959 births
2003 deaths
Space Shuttle Columbia disaster
Aviators from New York (state)
People from Plattsburgh, New York
People from Cheney, Washington
University of Washington College of Arts and Sciences alumni
Creighton University alumni
United States Air Force officers
20th-century African-American people
21st-century African-American people
African-American Christians
Aviators killed in aviation accidents or incidents in the United States
Accidental deaths in Texas
Recipients of the Congressional Space Medal of Honor
Recipients of the Defense Superior Service Medal
Recipients of the NASA Distinguished Service Medal
Recipients of the Defense Distinguished Service Medal
Burials at Arlington National Cemetery
People from Spokane, Washington
Space Shuttle program astronauts
Recipients of the Meritorious Service Medal (United States)
Mir crew members
United States Air Force astronauts